The year 1878 in science and technology involved many significant events, listed below.

Astronomy
 English astronomer Richard A. Proctor describes the Zone of Avoidance, the area of the night sky that is obscured by our own galaxy, for the first time.

Biology
 Death of last confirmed Cape Lion.

Chemistry
 The rare earth element holmium is identified in erbium by Marc Delafontaine and Jacques-Louis Soret in Geneva and by Per Teodor Cleve in Sweden.

Conservation
 An Act of Parliament in the United Kingdom places Epping Forest in the care of the City of London Corporation to remain unenclosed.

Exploration
 June 22 – Adolf Erik Nordenskiöld sets out on the year-long first navigation of the Northern Sea Route, the shipping lane from the Atlantic Ocean to the Pacific Ocean along the Siberian coast.

Geology
 Clarence King publishes Systematic Geology.
 Charles Lapworth publishes his analysis of the change in graptolite fossils through sequences of exposed shales in southern Scotland, establishing the importance of using graptolites to understand stratigraphic sequences.

Mathematics
 Belgian mathematician Victor D'Hondt describes the D'Hondt method of voting.
 English mathematician Rev. William Allen Whitworth is the first to publish Bertrand's ballot theorem.

Medicine
 Cesare Lombroso publishes L'uomo delinquente, setting out his theory of criminal atavism.
 Ádám Politzer publishes Lehrbuch der Ohrenheilkunde, a major otology textbook.
 Dentists Act in the United Kingdom limits the title of "dentist" and "dental surgeon" to qualified and registered practitioners.

Meteorology
 February 11 – The first weekly weather report is published in the United Kingdom.

Paleontology
 31 Iguanodon skeletons are discovered in a coal mine at Bernissart, Belgium.
 The sauropod genus Diplodocus is first named by Othniel Charles Marsh as well as the Theropod genus Allosaurus. These are both from the Jurassic aged Morrison formation.

Physics
 January 18 – Romanian mathematician Spiru Haret defends his doctoral thesis, which proves a result fundamental to the n-body problem in celestial mechanics.

Technology
 February 19 – The phonograph is patented by Thomas Edison. The oldest known audio recording is recovered from this device in 2012.
 March – The 'basic' process, enabling the use of phosphoric iron ore in steelmaking, developed at Blaenavon Ironworks by Percy Gilchrist and Sidney Gilchrist Thomas, is first made public.
 May 22 – John Philip Holland's experimental powered submarine Holland I is launched in Paterson, New Jersey.
 June 15 – Eadweard Muybridge produces the sequence of stop-motion still photographs Sallie Gardner at a Gallop in California, a predecessor of silent film (capable of being viewed as an animation on a zoopraxiscope) demonstrating that all four feet of a galloping horse are off the ground at the same time.
 August – Cleopatra's Needle is raised onto its base in London.
 October 14 – The world's first recorded floodlit football fixture is played at Bramall Lane in Sheffield.
 December 18 – Joseph Swan of Newcastle upon Tyne in England announces his invention of an incandescent light bulb.
 December 31 – Karl Benz produces a two-stroke gas engine.
 William Crookes invents the Crookes tube which produces cathode rays.
 Osbourn Dorsey obtains a patent in the United States for a "door-holding device".
 Gustav Kessel obtains a patent in Germany for an espresso machine.
 Czech painter Karel Klíč perfects the photogravure process.
 Lester Allan Pelton produces the first operational Pelton wheel.
 Remington, in the United States, introduce their No. 2 typewriter, the first with a shift key enabling production of lower as well as upper case characters.

Institutions
 October 1 – Virginia Polytechnic Institute and State University opens as Virginia Agricultural and Mechanical College in the United States.

Awards
 Copley Medal: Jean Baptiste Boussingault
 Wollaston Medal for Geology: Thomas Wright

Births
 January 1 – A. K. Erlang, Danish mathematician (died 1929)
 January 7 – Samuel James Cameron, Scottish obstetrician (died 1959)
 January 25 – Ernst Alexanderson, Swedish-born television pioneer (died 1975)
 February 5 – André Citroën, French automobile manufacturer (died 1935)
 February 8 – Martin Buber, Austrian philosopher (died 1965)
 February 10 – Jennie Smillie, Canadian gynecological surgeon (died 1981)
 February 28 – Pierre Fatou, French mathematician (died 1929)
 March 4 – Peter D. Ouspensky, Russian philosopher (died 1947)
 April 16 – Owen Thomas Jones, Welsh geologist (died 1967)
 June 3 – Barney Oldfield, American automobile racer and pioneer (died 1946)
 June 12 – James Oliver Curwood, American novelist and conservationist (died 1927)
 July 12 – Peeter Põld, Estonian politician and pedagogical scientist (died 1930)
 August 28 – George Whipple, American winner of the Nobel Prize in Physiology or Medicine (died 1976)
 September 5 – Robert von Lieben, Austrian physicist (died 1913)
 September 13 – Matilde Moisant, American pilot (died 1964)
 October 1 – Helen Mayo, Australian pediatrician (died 1967)
 November 7 – Lise Meitner, Austrian-Swedish physicist (died 1968)
 November 8 – Dorothea Bate, Welsh-born paleozoologist (died 1951)
 November 26 – Major Taylor, American cyclist (died 1932)
 December 25 – Louis Chevrolet, Swiss-born race driver and automobile builder (died 1941)
 December 25 – Joseph Schenck, Russian-born film executive (died 1962)

Deaths
 January 18 – William Stokes, Irish physician (born 1804)
 January 18 – Antoine César Becquerel, French scientist (born 1788)
 January 19 – Henri Victor Regnault, French physical chemist (born 1810)
 February 8 – Elias Magnus Fries, Swedish botanist (born 1794)
 February 10 – Claude Bernard, French physiologist (born 1813)
 February 26 – Angelo Secchi, Italian astronomer (born 1818)
 March 16 – William Banting, English undertaker and dietician (b. c.1796)
 May 13 – Joseph Henry, American physicist (born 1797)
 June 6 – Robert Stirling, Scottish clergyman and inventor (born 1790)
 July 23 – Baron Carl von Rokitansky, Bohemian pathologist (born 1804)
 September 25 – August Heinrich Petermann, German cartographer (born 1822)
 Friedrich Freese, German botanist (born 1794)

References

 
19th century in science
1870s in science